One of Us Is the Killer is the fifth studio album by American mathcore band The Dillinger Escape Plan, released on May 14, 2013. One of Us Is the Killer is the band's second release under their Party Smasher, Inc. imprint. The CD was released as a standard version that can be picked up at most record stores, and a limited version with a scratch-off cover that can only be bought at Best Buy containing two bonus tracks.

Background, lyrics and music
Vocalist Greg Puciato indicated that he chose the album title "pretty much as soon as I finished writing [the] song" of the same name. He explained that the meaning behind the title involves "a lot of issues on the album relate[d] to co-dependency and unknowingly destroying a relationship and taking responsibility for that and not pointing outward. The chorus of the song says 'one of us must die, but the killer won't survive.' In a relationship, you're both fifty percent at fault. It's about accepting responsibility instead of directing it outward." Puciato arrived at this view as a result of "two really critical relationships in my life that were under a lot of strain... in a state of turmoil [and] unhealthy", while the album was being written. In a 2015 interview, Puciato revealed that in his lyrics there were two or three references to Twilight Zone "that no one will ever find". The title of the instrumental track "CH 375 268 277 ARS" is a cipher that only one person close to the singer can understand (which is not Weinman).

By the time of composing, several bands from the 1990s hardcore punk scene, which Weinman used to watch live, had reunited. This led to him and drummer Billy Rymer going back to many old records before jamming and writing. They also tried to create more convoluted rhythms, making the record complex but "at the same time surprisingly groovy," according to Weinman. Upon hearing some of the instrumentals, Puciato thought, "What the fuck is happening? This sounds like a beehive!" A statement following Puciato's contributions to the album said that the musical style of One of Us Is the Killer would be "progressive ambient mixed with noise", instead.

Recording
Prior to recording One of Us Is the Killer, the band essentially constructed a studio around its practice space, making it the first album where all the music was composed during the writing process, except for a riff which originated when the band toured a few months before.

Vocalist Greg Puciato noted that the album "took a lot longer" to record, with the band members recording their respective instruments on consecutive days rather than alternating: "This time we did it traditionally and everyone tracked their instruments in succession. So I spent 25 days in a row recording vocals," said Puciato. He explained that this helped him to concentrate on how he delivered the vocals:

Although The Dillinger Escape Plan members liked the results, the process was extremely stressful and some vocal lines went through fifty takes before settling on one, while they made long-time producer Steve Evetts mix some songs "to the brink of exhaustion", e.g. "Prancer" was mixed around twenty-five times. Puciato said that Evetts almost quit ten times when recording, but they remained friends:

One of Us Is the Killer features high-profile guest vocalists playing other instruments, but the band members are not allowed to mention them. Puciato said, "think in terms of James Hetfield hitting a xylophone, but he's not one of them. ... They can reveal themselves and what they did if they ever want to individually."

Promotion
In contrast to their previous releases, previews of material slated to be on the album prior to its announcement were scarce. The band announced the album title and cover on their Facebook page on February 18, 2013. The first single from the album, "Prancer", was released on the iTunes Store, Google Play, and Amazon MP3 on March 12. On April 1, the band shared a preview of the album on Facebook, released by the label on YouTube on March 31. An official music video for the second track, "When I Lost My Bet" was released on YouTube on April 23, 2013. The album was streamed in its entirety on May 12. The single "Prancer" was used in the closing credits of the 2013 horror film Sanatorium.

Reception

Critical reception 

One Of Us Is the Killer achieved widespread critical acclaim. Metacritic, which assigns a normalized rating out of 100 to reviews from mainstream critics, the album has received an average score of 79, based on 10 reviews. Gregory Heaney of Allmusic, giving the album 4 out of 5 stars, commented on the album's accessibility (without the band leaving their signature sound), saying "This shift toward playing to the listener's gut rather than head gives The Dillinger Escape Plan a newfound level of accessibility without diminishing the impact of their punishing sound, and though it might seem like they're smoothing out the edges of their sound and turning their swords into plowshares, the reality is that they've just turned it into a different kind of weapon.", while Jacob Royal of Sputnikmusic gave the album a rating of 4.1 out of 5, stating "One Of Us Is the Killer is easily the most sprawling piece of work The Dillinger Escape Plan has created yet."

Track listing

Personnel
One of Us Is the Killer personnel according to CD liner notes.

The Dillinger Escape Plan
 Ben Weinman – guitars, programming
 Greg Puciato – lead vocals
 Liam Wilson – bass
 Billy Rymer – drums

Additional musicians
 Patrick Dougherty – trumpet, flugel horn
 "Tuba-Joe" Exley – tuba, valve trombone

Production
 Steve Evetts – engineering, production
 Ben Weinman – additional production
 Alan Douches – mastering

Artwork and design
 Brian Montuori – art direction, ink drawings, handwriting
 Daniel McBride – post-production, assemblage

Charts

Notes

References

External links 
 
  One of Us Is the Killer at Sumerian

2013 albums
The Dillinger Escape Plan albums
Sumerian Records albums
Albums produced by Steve Evetts